The Electronic Entertainment Expo 2013 (E3 2013) was the 19th E3 held. The event took place at the Los Angeles Convention Center in Los Angeles, California with many press conferences taking place at nearby venues including the Nokia Theater, Galen Center, and the Los Angeles Memorial Sports Arena. It began on June 11, 2013, and ended on June 13, 2013, with 48,200 total attendees.

The main highlights included details of two major next-generation consoles, Microsoft's Xbox One and Sony's PlayStation 4, as well as Nintendo's unveilings of Super Mario 3D World, Mario Kart 8, and Super Smash Bros. for Nintendo 3DS and Wii U.

Press conferences

Konami, Microsoft, Electronic Arts, Ubisoft, and Sony all hosted press conferences during the conference. However, Nintendo took a different approach by holding no traditional press conference. Instead, Nintendo held "a few smaller events that are specifically focused on our software lineup", and aired a special episode of  Nintendo Direct to focus on upcoming U.S. releases and new game unveilings.

Konami
Konami held its 3rd annual pre-E3 show on June 6. The presentation showcased the company's 40th anniversary and its Dance Dance Revolution: Classroom Edition initiative, before providing updates on upcoming game releases. This included the games Castlevania: Lords of Shadow 2, Pro Evolution Soccer 2014 and Metal Gear Solid V: The Phantom Pain.

Microsoft
Microsoft's press conference took place on June 10 at the Galen Center at 9:30am. The company announced a November 2013 release date for its forthcoming Xbox One console, priced at $499. The software lineup was also revealed, including Dead Rising 3, Quantum Break, Ryse: Son of Rome and the next installment of Halo, later revealed to be Halo 5: Guardians.

Controversy arose during Microsoft's showcase of Killer Instinct when an apparent reference to rape was made between the on-stage demonstrators. Microsoft later apologized for the incident and stated that the remarks were not scripted.

Electronic Arts
Electronic Arts' press conference took place on June 10 at the Nokia Theater at 1:00pm. Among the new titles shown were the racing game Need for Speed: Rivals, the parkour simulator Mirror's Edge Catalyst and the first-person shooters Battlefield 4 and Titanfall. EA Sports announced a number of new releases, such as Madden NFL 25, NBA Live 14, FIFA 14, NHL 14 and EA Sports UFC.

Ubisoft
Ubisoft's press conference took place on June 10 at 3:00pm. Upcoming action-adventure games included Watch Dogs and the sequels Assassin's Creed IV: Black Flag and Tom Clancy's Splinter Cell: Blacklist. Two new franchises – The Crew and The Division – were also announced.

Sony
Sony's press conference took place on June 10 at the Los Angeles Memorial Sports Arena at 6:00pm. The PlayStation 4 was publicly shown for the first time, retailing at $399. The software lineup included Infamous: Second Son, The Order: 1886, Final Fantasy XV and Killzone: Shadow Fall. There were also new games introduced for the PlayStation 3, such as Gran Turismo 6, Beyond: Two Souls and The Last of Us.

Nintendo
The E3 edition of Nintendo Direct aired at June 11 at 7:00am. Nintendo first showed a new trailer for the Nintendo 3DS titles Pokémon X and Y, including the announcement of a new Pokémon type, Fairy Type. After that, Nintendo focused mostly on showing upcoming Wii U titles. Nintendo showed some of the third-party and digital titles coming to the Wii U, and more about previously announced games such as X, The Wonderful 101, The Legend of Zelda: The Wind Waker HD, and the first gameplay footage of Bayonetta 2. Among the new games announced for Wii U were the new installments of Super Smash Bros., Super Smash Bros. for Nintendo 3DS and Super Smash Bros. for Wii U, Super Mario 3D World, Mario Kart 8, and Donkey Kong Country: Tropical Freeze.

List of notable exhibitors
This is a list of major video game exhibitors who made appearances at E3 2013.

 505 Games
 Activision Blizzard
 Atlus
 Bethesda
 Capcom
 CD Projekt Red
 Deep Silver
 Disney
 Electronic Arts
 Konami
 Microsoft
 Namco Bandai
 Nintendo
 Sega
 Sony
 Square Enix
 Tecmo Koei
 Ubisoft
 Warner Bros.
 XSEED Games

List of featured games
This is a list of notable titles that appeared at E3 2013.

References

2013 in Los Angeles
2013 in video gaming
2013
June 2013 events in the United States